Thomas or Tom McEwan may refer to:

 Thomas McEwan Jr. (1854–1926), American politician from New Jersey
 Thomas McEwan (painter) (1846–1914), Scottish painter
 Tom McEwan (whitewater kayaker) (born 1946), American whitewater kayaker
 Tom McEwan (footballer) (1885–1958), Australian rules footballer
 Tom McEwan (bookbinder), Scottish master craftsman and bookbinder